Ian James Evans (born 30 March 1982) is an English cricketer.  Evans is a right-handed batsman who bowls right-arm off break.  He was born in Oxford, Oxfordshire.

Evans made his debut for Oxfordshire in the 2001 Minor Counties Championship against Wales Minor Counties.  Evans played Minor counties cricket for Oxfordshire from 2001 to 2004, which included 11 Minor Counties Championship matches.  He made his List A debut against Huntingdonshire in the 2001 Cheltenham & Gloucester Trophy.  He played 2 further List A matches, against the Nottinghamshire Cricket Board in the 1st round of the 2002 Cheltenham & Gloucester Trophy which was held in 2001 and against Shropshire in the 2nd round which was also played in 2001.  In his 3 List A matches he scored 21 runs at a batting average of 7.00, with a high score of 18.  With the ball he took a single wicket for the cost of 36 runs.

His twin brother, Philip, has also played Minor counties and List A cricket for Oxfordshire.

References

External links
Ian Evans at ESPNcricinfo
Ian Evans at CricketArchive

1982 births
Living people
Cricketers from Oxford
English cricketers
Oxfordshire cricketers
Twin sportspeople
English twins